Pengelli National Nature Reserve is part of the largest block of ancient oak woodland in West Wales. It has survived for hundreds of years, despite being modified by people. Lying near the village of Eglwyswrw in the north of Pembrokeshire, it makes up part of the gentle agricultural landscape which lies between the foot of the Preseli hills and the sea. Species found in this rich woodland include badgers, polecats and the elusive dormouse.

National nature reserves in Wales